Silke may refer to:

 Silke (actress) a Spanish actress known by her mononym
 Silke (given name)
 Silke (surname)
 Silke, fictional character Samuel Silke in Daredevil comics
 Silke, novel by Lacey Dancer
 Silke, comic series published by Dark Horse Comics

See also 
 Silkie (disambiguation)